Neundorf may refer to the following places in Germany:

Neundorf, Saxony-Anhalt, in the Salzlandkreis, Saxony-Anhalt
Neundorf bei Lobenstein, in the Saale-Orla-Kreis, Thuringia
Neundorf bei Schleiz, in the Saale-Orla-Kreis, Thuringia
Neundorf (Pirna), a subdivision of Pirna, Saxony
Neundorf auf dem Eigen, part of Herrnhut, Saxony